Bruno Villabruna (12 August 1884 – 16 October 1971) was an Italian lawyer and liberal politician.

Born in Santa Giustina, near Belluno in the Veneto, he was first elected to parliament in 1921. After the rise to power of the fascists, he joined, unlike many other liberals, the democratic opposition around old leader Giovanni Giolitti and in 1924 refused to candidate himself in the fascist-led national union list. When all political parties were dissolved in early 1925, he retired from political life and kept on being a lawyer.

In July 1943, with the Mussolini regime having been overthrown, he was appointed podestà of Turin, but had to resign after 45 days because of the German occupation. In the liberated Northern Italy in 1945, he became a member of the Consulta Nazionale and in 1946 was elected to the Assemblea Costituente. He failed being elected to the first parliament of the Italian Republic in 1948, but a few months later he was appointed Secretary General of the Italian Liberal Party (PLI), that went through a deep crisis caused by his extreme right-wing predecessor Roberto Lucifero. Villabruna tried to convince the left-wing dissident group Movimento Liberale Indipendente (MLI) led by Count Nicolò Carandini to return into the ranks of PLI, which they had left in early 1948, but only in late 1951 did this operation come to a successful conclusion.

In 1954 Villabruna became Minister of Industry and Trade in the Scelba government, and let the leadership of the Liberal Party to Giovanni Malagodi, with whom he came into serious quarrels few time later. In 1955 he left the PLI.  Together with Carandini and Leone Cattani he was now among the founders of the Radical Party. From 1958 to 1960 he was Secretary General of this party, retiring definitely to private life after its dissolution in 1962.

Villabruna died in 1971 in Torre Pellice, Pinerolo.

Sources

External links 
 10/11 December 1955 - Italy: Rome - Foundation of the Radical Party
 (1) l'organizzazione del partito radicale (1955 1962)

1884 births
1971 deaths
Italian Liberal Party politicians
Radical Party (Italy) politicians
Government ministers of Italy
Members of the Chamber of Deputies (Italy)
Members of the Constituent Assembly of Italy
Mayors of Turin
Politicians of Veneto